Chloride Group, a business of Vertiv, is the UK's largest supplier of secure power systems to hospitals and other public buildings and facilities. Formerly listed on the London Stock Exchange and a constituent of FTSE 250 index, the company has been owned by Emerson Electric since September 2010.

History
Chloride Group was founded in 1891 as The Chloride Electrical Syndicate Limited to manufacture batteries. Brand names used included Ajax, Exide, Dagenite, Kathanode, Shednought and Tudor.

In the 1970s, under its then managing director Sir Michael Edwardes it showcased the UK's first battery power buses.

In 1999, it diversified into secure power systems acquiring Oneac in the US, BOAR SA in Spain and Hytek in Australia. In 2000, it acquired the power protection division of Siemens in Germany and in 2001 it acquired Continuous Power International followed, in 2005, by Harath Engineering Services in the UK. In 2007, it acquired AST Electronique Services, a similar business in France.

In July 2009, the Company announced the acquisition of a 90% stake in India’s leading Uninterruptible power supply company, DB Power Electronics.

In September 2010, Chloride Group was fully acquired by Emerson Electric (joining the Emerson Network Power platform) of the United States for US$1.5 billion.

In 2016, Emerson Network Power was acquired by Platinum Equity for US$4 billion. The business was rebranded under the name Vertiv, launching as a stand-alone business.

References

External links
Official website
 

Engineering companies of the United Kingdom
Companies based in London
Companies formerly listed on the London Stock Exchange
Technology companies established in 1891
1891 establishments in England
Technology companies disestablished in 2010
2010 disestablishments in England